Ilyinka is a rural locality (a village) in Mansurovsky Selsoviet, Uchalinsky District, Bashkortostan, Russia. The population was 173 as of 2010. There are 5 streets.

Geography 
Ilyinka is located 28 km northeast of Uchaly (the district's administrative centre) by road. Mansurovo is the nearest rural locality.

References 

Rural localities in Uchalinsky District